The 1992 New Zealand tour rugby to Australia and South Africa was the 28th tour by the All Blacks to Australia, and their 6th tour to South Africa. It was first official visit by the New Zealand team to South Africa since the controversial tour of 1976.

The Wallabies defeated the All Blacks in the test series played in Australia by two tests to one, but the All Blacks went undefeated in South Africa including the one test match against the Springboks.

In Australia 
The All Blacks lost the Bledisloe Cup and won only one test match out of the three played against the Wallabies.

Scores and results list New Zealand's points tally first.

In South Africa 
'Scores and results list New Zealand's points tally first. External links 
 New Zealand in Australia and South Africa 1992 from rugbymuseum.co.nz''

1992 in Australian rugby union
1992 in New Zealand rugby union
1992 in South African rugby union
1992
1992